Pang Ji (died 202), courtesy name Yuantu, was a Chinese politician serving under the warlord Yuan Shao during the late Eastern Han dynasty of China.

Pang Ji was criticised by Cao Cao's advisor Xun Yu as "brave but heedless of other's opinions." Being very bitter towards his rivals, Pang Ji slandered Tian Feng after Yuan Shao's defeat at the Battle of Guandu and caused Tian Feng to commit suicide. Pang Ji later went on to serve under Yuan Shang, Yuan Shao's successor. Since Yuan Shang was the youngest of Yuan Shao's sons, there was intense sibling rivalry. Yuan Shao's eldest son Yuan Tan was on the verge of rebellion, and Pang Ji and Shen Pei suggested sending a small army to aid Yuan Tan in the defence against Cao Cao's follow-up attacks in order to resolve the tension. Pang Ji went along as an emissary. However, Yuan Tan was not pleased with the reinforcements and demanded that Yuan Shang send more troops. He was flatly refused by Shen Pei and he killed Pang Ji in anger.

See also
 Lists of people of the Three Kingdoms

Notes

References

 Chen, Shou (3rd century). Records of the Three Kingdoms (Sanguozhi).
 Fan, Ye (5th century). Book of the Later Han (Houhanshu).
 Pei, Songzhi (5th century). Annotations to Records of the Three Kingdoms (Sanguozhi zhu).
 Sima, Guang (1084). Zizhi Tongjian.

202 deaths
2nd-century births
3rd-century executions
Executed Han dynasty people
Officials under Yuan Shao
People executed by the Han dynasty